Pelecotheca is a genus of parasitic flies in the family Tachinidae. There are about eight described species in Pelecotheca.

Species
These eight species belong to the genus Pelecotheca:
 Pelecotheca biseta (Arnaud, 1963)
 Pelecotheca flavipes Thompson, 1968
 Pelecotheca macilenta (Wulp, 1890)
 Pelecotheca macra (Wulp, 1890)
 Pelecotheca panamensis Townsend, 1919
 Pelecotheca paulensis Townsend, 1929
 Pelecotheca sabroskyi (Arnaud, 1963)
 Pelecotheca trinidadensis Thompson, 1968

References

Further reading

 
 
 
 

Tachinidae
Articles created by Qbugbot